Apolemichthys is a genus of marine angelfishes in the family Pomacanthidae.

Species 

Fishbase still has Apolemichthys armitagei listed as a species within this genus but notes that it is a hybrid between Apolemichthys trimaculatus and Apolemichthys xanthurus. Fishbase state that the page will be removed as part of their next update.

References

Pomacanthidae
Marine fish genera